The following is a list of awards and nominations received by Edie Falco.

Falco is an American television, film and stage actress, known for her roles as Diane Whittlesey in the HBO series Oz, as Carmela Soprano on the HBO series The Sopranos, and as the titular character of the Showtime series Nurse Jackie. Her work in these television programs have garnered immense critical reception, with Falco receiving two Golden Globe Awards, four Primetime Emmy Awards and five Screen Actors Guild Awards (from a mass twenty nominations total).

Her stage work is also greatly recognized. Falco was the recipient for a Drama Desk Award for Outstanding Featured Actress in a Play and has also been nominated for a Tony Award.

Motion Picture awards

Independent Spirit Awards

Satellite Awards

Television awards

AFI Awards

Golden Globe Awards

Primetime Emmy Awards

Satellite Awards

Screen Actors Guild Awards

Viewers for Quality Television Awards

Critic awards

Dallas-Fort Worth Film Critics Association Awards

Los Angeles Film Critics Association Awards

Online Film Critics Society Awards

Television Critics Association Awards

Theatre awards

Drama Desk Awards

Outer Critics Circle Awards

Theatre World Awards

Tony Awards

References

External links
 
 

Falco, Edie